The 2021 AJ Bell Women's Tour was the seventh staging of The Women's Tour, a women's cycling stage race held in the United Kingdom. It ran from 4 to 9 October 2021, as part of the 2021 UCI Women's World Tour.

Route

Classification leadership table

Final standings

See also

 2021 in women's road cycling

Notes

References

External links

2021 UCI Women's World Tour
2021 in women's road cycling
2021 in British women's sport
2021
October 2021 sports events in the United Kingdom